Thomas McMahon (born 1948) is a former volunteer in the South Armagh Brigade of the Provisional Irish Republican Army (IRA), and was one of the IRA's most experienced bomb-makers. McMahon was convicted of the murder of  Lord Louis Mountbatten and three others off the coast of Mullaghmore, County Sligo, in the west of Ireland.

IRA activity

McMahon planted a bomb in Shadow V, a  fishing boat owned by Mountbatten at Mullaghmore, County Sligo, near Donegal Bay. Lord Mountbatten was killed on 27 August 1979 by the bomb blast along with three other people: Doreen Knatchbull (Mountbatten's elder daughter's mother-in-law); his grandson Nicholas Knatchbull; and a 15-year-old crewmember Paul Maxwell. McMahon was arrested by the Gardaí (the Republic of Ireland's police force) at a Garda checkpoint between Longford and Granard on suspicion of driving a stolen vehicle two hours before the bomb detonated. The IRA claimed responsibility for the bombing in a statement released immediately afterwards that said: "This operation is one of the discriminate ways we can bring to the attention of the English people the continuing occupation of our country."

McMahon was tried for the assassinations in the Republic of Ireland, and convicted by forensic evidence supplied by James O'Donovan that showed flecks of paint from the boat and traces of nitroglycerine on his clothes. Although he was convicted of murder on 23 November 1979 and sentenced to life imprisonment, he served less than 20 years because he was released in 1998 under the terms of the Good Friday Agreement.

After prison
After his release, Toby Harnden in Bandit Country reported that McMahon was holding a tricolour in the first rank of the IRA colour party at a 1998 IRA meeting in Cullyhanna. However, according to a BBC report, McMahon has said that he had left the IRA in 1990.

He has twice refused to meet Paul Maxwell's father, John, who has sought him out to explain the reasons for his son's death. In an interview for The Telegraph in 2009, Maxwell stated that he had "made two approaches to McMahon, the first through a priest, who warned me in advance that he thought there wouldn't be any positive response. And there wasn't. I have some reservations about meeting him, obviously – it might work out in such a way that I would regret having made the contact. On the other hand, if we met and I could even begin to understand his motivation. If we could meet on some kind of a human level, a man to man level, it could help me come to terms with it. But that might be very optimistic. McMahon knows the door is open at this end."

His wife has stated, "Tommy never talks about Mountbatten, only the boys who died. He does have genuine remorse. Oh God yes."

As of 2009, McMahon was living with his wife in a hillside bungalow in Lisanisk, Carrickmacross, County Monaghan. He has two grown sons. He helped with Martin McGuinness's presidential campaign in 2011, erecting posters for McGuinness around Carrickmacross, and also canvassed for Sinn Féin's Matt Carthy in the 2014 European Parliament elections.

References

Bibliography
Mountbatten murder suspects on leaked list from Irish Independent, 4 January 2004

1948 births
Living people
Bombers (people)
Irish nationalist assassins
Irish mass murderers
Irish people convicted of murder
Irish prisoners sentenced to life imprisonment
Irish republicans
People from County Monaghan
Prisoners sentenced to life imprisonment by the Republic of Ireland
Provisional Irish Republican Army members
Republicans imprisoned during the Northern Ireland conflict